Manuel Antonio "Manny" Rojas Zúñiga (born June 13, 1954) is a retired football midfielder from Chile, who represented his native country at the 1982 FIFA World Cup in Spain.  His professional career took him from his native Chile to Mexico and ultimately the United States. He spent two seasons in the North American Soccer League, four in the Major Indoor Soccer League, three in the American Indoor Soccer Association and one in the American Soccer League.

Rojas also coached the now-defunct Chicago Soul soccer team for the 2012 year before being fired midseason after a 2-7 start.

Playing
Rojas began his professional club with Chilean First Division club Palestino.  He then moved to Mexican Club América for the 1975 season.  At some point, he signed with Universidad Católica of Chile and was on their roster for the 1981–82 season.  In 1983, he moved to the United States where he signed with the Tampa Bay Rowdies of the North American Soccer League (NASL).  He scored eight goals in twenty-nine games that season to lead the team in scoring.  On March 23, 1984, the Rowdies released Rojas and he signed a few days later with the Golden Bay Earthquakes.  However, on July 10, 1984, the Earthquakes sent Rojas and Hayden Knight to the Chicago Sting in exchange for Ricardo Alonso and Charlie Fajkus.  Rojas found himself with a team on the rise as the Sting won the 1984 NASL championship.  While he scored only one goal during the regular season, he added two more in the post-season, including one in a 2–1 victory over the Toronto Blizzard in the first game of the championship series.  When the NASL folded at the end of the 1984 NASL season, the Sting moved to the Major Indoor Soccer League (MISL).  Rojas remained with the Sting until it folded at the end of the 1987-1988 MISL season.  That summer, he rejoined the Rowdies, who were then playing in the American Soccer League then signed with the expansion Chicago Power of the American Indoor Soccer Association.  Rojas remained with the Power through the 1990–91 season, scoring seven goals in twenty-one games as the Power won the AISA championship.

National team
Rojas' career with Chile national team spanned from 1976 to 1982.  That year, he capped his national team career when he was selected to the Chilean team which competed in the 1982 FIFA World Cup in Spain.  He was awarded the Chilean National Sportsmanship Award 1978 and 1981

Coaching
Rojas has extensive coaching experience, most of it at the youth level.  He acted as an assistant coach while with the Chicago Power.  He has also been an assistant coach for both the Libertyville and Vernon Hills high school soccer teams. On September 25, 2012, he was named the head coach of the Chicago Soul in the MISL, but was fired on December 2, 2012 after the team went 2-7. He is now coaching at FC 1974 in Libertyville with U10-U14 teams.

References

External links
 Youth club bio
  
 NASL/MISL stats

                   

1954 births
Living people
Footballers from Santiago
Chilean footballers
Chilean expatriate footballers
Club Deportivo Palestino footballers
Association football midfielders
Club América footballers
Club Deportivo Universidad Católica footballers
Chile international footballers
1982 FIFA World Cup players
1979 Copa América players
Chilean Primera División players
Liga MX players
North American Soccer League (1968–1984) players
North American Soccer League (1968–1984) indoor players
Tampa Bay Rowdies (1975–1993) players
San Jose Earthquakes (1974–1988) players
Chicago Sting (NASL) players
Major Indoor Soccer League (1978–1992) players
Chicago Sting (MISL) players
American Indoor Soccer Association players
Chicago Power players
American soccer coaches
American Indoor Soccer Association coaches
Chilean expatriate sportspeople in the United States
Expatriate soccer players in the United States
Chilean expatriate sportspeople in Mexico
Expatriate footballers in Mexico
United Soccer League (1984–85) players